Glycerol-3-phosphate acyltransferase 1, mitochondrial is an enzyme that in humans is encoded by the GPAM gene.

Glycerol-3-phosphate acyltransferase (GPAT; EC 2.3.1.15), which catalyzes the initial and committing step in glycerolipid biosynthesis, is predicted to play a pivotal role in the regulation of cellular triacylglycerol and phospholipid levels. Two mammalian forms of GPAT have been identified on the basis of localization to either the endoplasmic reticulum or mitochondria.[supplied by OMIM]

References

Further reading